General Major is a rank in certain militaries.

General Major may also refer to:

James Patrick Major (1836–1877), Confederate States Army brigadier general
Jenő Major (1891–1972), Royal Hungarian Army colonel general

See also
Attorney General Major (disambiguation)
Macrianus Major (died 261), Roman usurper in the battle of Edessa